Jeunesse Club d'Abidjan (JC Abidjan) is an Ivorian football club based in Abidjan.

History
It was founded in 1932. They play at the Stade Robert Champroux. The club is current member of the Côte d'Ivoire Premier Division.

Current squad

Achievements

Côte d'Ivoire Cup: 1
1963.
Final: 2008, 2010.

Coupe Houphouët-Boigny: 1
2010.

Performance in CAF competitions
CAF Champions League: 1 appearance
2011 - withdrew in First Round

CAF Confederation Cup: 2 appearances
2006 - First Round
2009 - First Round of 16

CAF Cup: 1 appearance
2003 - Second Round

Notes

Football clubs in Ivory Coast
Football clubs in Abidjan
Association football clubs established in 1932
1932 establishments in Ivory Coast
Sports clubs in Ivory Coast